Iztok Božič (born 27 September 1971) is a former professional tennis player from Slovenia. He is also a former captain of the Slovenia Fed Cup team.

Biography

Early years
Božič, who was born in Maribor, began playing tennis at the age of seven. 

As a junior he made the round of 16 at the 1989 Australian Open, where he also partnered with Patrick Rafter in the boys doubles.

ATP career
In the early 1990s he began competing professionally and has the distinction of being the first player representing Slovenia to be ranked in world's top 200.

He was runner-up at the Kosice Challenger in 1994 and twice appeared in the main draw of ATP Tour tournaments, both times as a qualifier. At the 1995 ATP St. Pölten he took third seed Gilbert Schaller to three sets in the first round and also lost in the opening round of the Croatia Open in 2001, in three sets to Óscar Serrano.

In 1998 he made the final round of the qualifying competition at three of the four Grand Slam tournaments, the Australian Open, French Open and US Open.

Representative
At the 1992 Summer Olympics, Božič was a member of Slovenia's first ever Olympics squad as an independent nation and took part in the men's doubles competition. He and partner Blaž Trupej were beaten in the opening round by the Indian pairing of Leander Paes and Ramesh Krishnan.

Božič played in a total of 15 Davis Cup ties for Slovenia during his career, the first in 1994 was against Greece, in Slovenia's first ever home fixture. By the time he retired he had amassed an overall 14/14 record, with all of those wins coming in singles.

He won a silver medal for Slovenia at the 1997 Mediterranean Games, in the men's doubles with Borut Urh.

References

External links
 
 
 

1971 births
Living people
Slovenian male tennis players
Sportspeople from Maribor
Tennis players at the 1992 Summer Olympics
Olympic tennis players of Slovenia
Competitors at the 1997 Mediterranean Games
Mediterranean Games silver medalists for Slovenia
Mediterranean Games medalists in tennis